Wǔ Xíng is a synthesis of traditional painting with its namesake philosophic tradition Wǔ Xíng – or, more specifically, the use of Chinese Xie Yi painting techniques and the metaphysics of the five Wǔ Xíng elements. Wǔ Xíng painting also inherited some traits from several Wu Shu and Qi Gong schools. The closest in style is Xingyiquan, whose 5 primary movements are balanced with the 5 elements of Wǔ Xíng. Because Wǔ Xíng painting techniques are associated foremost with consciousness and overcoming corporeal restraints, it is common to speak of the manifest art therapy influence of this method.

Because the philosophical, and technical components of this type of painting have been taken from Chinese culture, it is common to hear it referred to as “Chinese Wǔ Xíng painting”.

Wǔ Xíng painting has a total of five brush strokes, five movements, and five types of composition, corresponding to the elements “Wood”, “Fire”, “Earth”, “Metal”, and “Water”.

Wǔ Xíng painting is metaphysics. Through Wǔ Xíng painting one can create a picture identical in its external appearance to any example of traditional Chinese painting. In this regard there is no difference between Wǔ Xíng painting and Chinese painting. Still, if one compares Wǔ Xíng painting and Guo Hua there are a number of differences in technique:
Traditional Guo Hua painting is divided into several genres: mountains and water, birds and branches, grass and insects, etc. and does not usually extend beyond these genres. Wǔ Xíng painting is not tied to any genres. Using the five brush strokes the artist can paint everything that they want.
Traditional Chinese Guo Hua painting inherited an attachment to rice paper and silk as well as to a certain type of paint, while Wǔ Xíng has no such limitations.

The single most important thing for the artist who practices Wǔ Xíng painting is an attractive image harmoniously constructed using the Wǔ Xíng system. Everything else is secondary, including the type of artistic materials, the genre, and so on.

References

External links 
 [M. A. Parnakh. Chinese Painting Methods// WU XING Chinese Painting.]
 A. Scherbakov. Some Words on Russian Folk Chinese Culture and Chinese Wǔ Xíng Painting // WǓ XÍNG Chinese Painting.
 A. Scherbakov. How Wǔ Xíng Philosophical Principles are Incorporated in Wǔ Xíng Painting. // WǓ XÍNG Chinese Painting.

Chinese painting
Arts in China
Wu Xing